Viveck Ji Of (Chakra Sonic), born April 8, 1976, is a Malaysian hip hop artist. He is a Malaysian Indian, Tamil by ethnicity.

Viveck Ji owns the record label (DISS THA STUDIO) and music publishing company, releasing his own recordings as well as those of other artists. His songs were nominated for Anugerah Industri Musik for the title of "Ulek Mayang", and the song which was nominated yearly representing the Tamil Music Diaspora in Anugerah Era for the song "Sang Puteri".

References
 
http://www.malaysiamix.com/2008/09/.../chakrasonic-verra-puranam 

http://www.friendzcabmedia.com

Living people
1976 births
Malaysian rappers
People from Kuala Lumpur
Malaysian people of Indian descent
Malaysian hip hop singers